Danilovka is a rural locality (a village) in Korneyevsky Selsoviet, Meleuzovsky District, Bashkortostan, Russia. The population was 420 as of 2010. There are 6 streets.

Geography 
Danilovka is located 62 km north of Meleuz (the district's administrative centre) by road. Yelimbetovo is the nearest rural locality.

References 

Rural localities in Meleuzovsky District